Mucilaginibacter boryungensis is a Gram-negative, non-spore-forming and non-motile bacterium from the genus of Mucilaginibacter which has been isolated from soil from the west coast of Boryeong on Korea.

References

Sphingobacteriia
Bacteria described in 2011